Woodhouse Colliery, also known as Whitehaven coal mine, is a proposed coal mine near to Whitehaven in Cumbria, England. The proposal is for the first deep coal mine in England since Asfordby pit in 1986. The coal mine has been advertised as bringing jobs to a deprived area but has also come in for criticism by green campaigners. In 2019, Cumbria County Council granted the planning permission for the venture.

It is not to be confused with the former Woodhouse Close Colliery in Woodhouse Close, Bishop Auckland (County Durham) which operated between 1835 and 1934.

The colliery would be the first new deep coal mine in the United Kingdom in 30 years. The mine is proposed by West Cumbria Mining and plans to extract coking coal from beneath the Irish Sea for 25 years. The plan has been criticised by some MPs, scientists and environmentalists due to the coal mine's environmental impact and compromising the UK government's legal commitments to reduce UK carbon emissions.

History
In June 2014, West Cumbria Mining announced its intention to invest £14.7 million in a venture to explore for premium quality coking coal underneath the sea off Whitehaven. The project had started before as a plan to find and gasify the coal for energy use, but when the quality of the coal was discovered, it precipitated a shift into mining the coal for steelmaking. It is intended to use the coal only for coking rather than for the electricity supply industry (ESI). The fall in the price of ESI coal in the world markets also precipitated the closure of mines using coal only for ESI. If approved, the mine would be Englands' first deep coal mine since the Asfordby pit was sunk in 1987.

Backers of the scheme point out that Britain imports  of coal per year, of which none is sourced in Europe, with most being from Australia and the USA.

The mine would use former but extant tunnels from previous mining ventures for coal and anhydrite. The mine head would be located on the former Marchon chemical works site close to Haig Colliery and the suburb of Woodhouse just south of Whitehaven town centre in Cumbria.

This will determine the quality of the coal and check for any geological conditions that could affect the planning of the mine. On the 8th September 2017 West Cumbria Mining's drilling contractors accidently caused a methane leak in the Irish Sea. UK Coastguard said they were notified that drilling operations from a jack-up barge had struck a gas pocket approximately one nautical mile from St Bee’s Head, emergency services were on standby..

Trains would number up to six per day including Saturdays, though the company acknowledge that the increase in traffic on the railway would require signalling improvements on the Cumbrian Coast Line. Additionally, West Cumbria Mining have applied to install a solar farm on the estate that would cover  and provide 40% of the electricity needs of the mining operation.

West Cumbria Mining is owned by EMR Capital, a company based in Australia that has injected over £20 million into the venture by June 2017. A further £200 million was projected to be spent in final testing, acquisition of rights and the implementation of the mine. The facility itself is expected to cost in the region of £165 million.

The prospect of England's first new coal mine in over 30 years was first opposed by nuclear safety campaigners Radiation Free Lakeland with their slogan: 'Keep Cumbrian coal in the hole''. The first demonstration against the mine took place in Bowness in September 2017.  The protesters have pointed out that the underground workings would extend to within  of the nuclear ponds at Sellafield and they also cite the proximity of the mine to a proposed new nuclear facility at Moorside. Another concern is that of the prevalence of methane in the Cumbrian Coalfield. The protest group have pointed out that the dangerous levels of gas made the region an ideal test-bed for the Davy Lamp in 1816.

Approvals and appeals
In March 2019, a meeting of Cumbria County Council's planning committee voted unanimously in favour of the project citing "the desperate need for jobs, particularly in deprived wards close to the proposed new mine". Green campaigners announced that they would launch a legal challenge. A spokesperson for South Lakes Action on Climate Change, said that the mine would "totally undermine Cumbria's chances of hitting emission targets".

In November 2019, the government decided not to intervene in the appeals process and stated the "...[Cumbria County] Council should take the decision". Work on the site is expected to start in 2020, with coaling operations starting in 2022.

In exercise of his powers under Article 31 of the Town and Country Planning (Development Management Procedure) (England) Order 2015, the Secretary of State directed the Council, in a letter dated 28 September 2020, not to grant permission to the West Cumbria Mining (WCM) application without specific authorisation. The Cumbria County Council Development Control and Regulation Committee were nevertheless reported to have approved West Cumbria Mining plans for the mine in October 2020 for a third time.

In January 2021 Secretary of State Robert Jenrick refused South Lakeland MP Tim Farron's request to call in the plans for review,  by issuing a letter dated 6 January 2021 withdrawing the Article 31 Direction issued pursuant to the Secretary of State's letter of 28 September 2020. In January 2021 the chair of the Committee on Climate Change (CCC), Lord Deben, sent a letter to Jenrick rebuking him for allowing the planning permission to stand. The government responded that the decision not to call in the coal mine would not be reversed.  

On 28 January 2021 the Coal Authority announced that on 18 January 2020 West Cumbria Mining had applied for, and been granted, an indefinite extension to the duration of two of their three Coal Authority licences, as both licences were due to run out on 24 January 2021.

On 9 February 2021 Cumbria County Council officers told West Cumbria Mining it had decided to return the planning application for Woodhouse Colliery back to their Development Control and Regulation Committee for re-determination.

In March 2021 Jenrick announced he was 'calling in' the planning application.

Extraction and environmental impact 
The mine would extract 2.7m tonnes of coking coal per year, which is used in steel-making. Around 85% of the coal is planned to be exported.

It is estimated that the coal extracted from the mine would emit 8.4 million tonnes of carbon dioxide per year, in 2019 the UK's total carbon emissions were 354 million tonnes. The UK Climate Change Committee chair Lord Deben has stated that "this is greater than the level of annual emissions we have projected from all open UK coalmines to 2050."

Economic impact 
Supporters of the mine have claimed that supplying coking coal for steel manufacture in the UK would reduce coal imports. West Cumbria Mining have projected the mine would create 500 jobs and said they would pay into a community fund for 10 years. A Facebook page "We Support West Cumbria Mining" has been rallying local support to counter the protests from environmental groups.

Reactions 
Some MPs, developing country experts, scientists, green campaigners and government advisers have criticised the mine.

Climate change campaigner Greta Thunberg criticised the approval of the mine stating: 'The UK government has decided not to intervene with the plans of opening a brand new English coal mine. This really shows the true meaning of so called "net zero 2050". These vague, insufficient targets long into the future basically mean nothing today.'

James Hansen, adjunct professor directing the Program on Climate Science, Awareness and Solutions of the Earth Institute at Columbia University and former director of the NASA Goddard Institute for Space Studies stated approving the mine showed a "contemptuous disregard for the future of young people" and that "It shows they (the government) are really not serious," about climate change.

Prof Sir Robert Watson who has worked on atmospheric science issues including ozone depletion, global warming and paleoclimatology since the 1980s called the coal mine 'absolutely ridiculous'.

MP Tim Farron described the coal mine as a "complete disaster for our children's future". Greenpeace UK stated "claims that it will be carbon neutral are like claiming an oil rig is a wind turbine."

A climate change campaigner went on a 10 day hunger strike in protest in February 2020.

Mohamed Adow, winner of the Climate Breakthrough Award and director of the Power Shift Africa thinktank stated: "It's a bizarre and shocking decision. People in the developing world who are suffering from the effects of the climate crisis will be horrified. They are relying on the UK to be their champion on climate change and be an example, not returning to the dirty days of coal."

In February 2021, 40 Conservative Party MPs signed a letter to the local council's Labour leader urging them to approve the project.

References

Notes

Sources

External links
WCM Stakeholder Brochure
Keep Cumbrian Coal in the Hole webpage

Coal mines in England
Mining in Cumbria
Whitehaven
Undersea collieries in the United Kingdom